Cicadulini is a tribe of leafhoppers in the subfamily Deltocephalinae. There are currently 15 genera and over 120 species in Cicadulini.

Genera 
There are currently 15 described genera in Cicadulini:

References 

Cicadellidae